In Buddhism, dhamma vicaya (Pali) has been variously translated as the "analysis of qualities," "discrimination of dhammas," "discrimination of states," "investigation of doctrine,"  
and "searching the Truth." The meaning is ambivalent; it implies the investigation of the Buddhist teachings (dhamma), but also the application of discernment to body-mind phenomena in order to apply right effort, giving way to entry into the first jhana.

Etymology
According to Rupert Gethin, "Dhamma-vicaya means either the 'discrimination of dhammas' or the 'discernment of dhamma'; to discriminate dhammas is precisely to discern dhamma."

Textual appearances

Seven factors of Awakening
In the Pali canon's Sutta Pitaka, this is the second of the Seven Factors of Awakening (satta bojjhagā). It is preceded by the establishment of mindfulness (sati) and applied with energy/effort (viriya) Together, mindfulness, discernment and effort calm the mind, and give way to the onset of the jhanas, which are characterised by the remaining four factors of awakening, namely rapture (piti), tranquility (passaddhi), unification (samadhi) and equanimity (upekkha). According to the Samyutta Nikaya, this factor is to be developed by paying continuous careful attention (yoniso manasikāra bahulīkāro) to the following states (dhammā): wholesome and unwholesome (kusalā-akusalā); blameable and blameless (sāvajjā-anavajjā); inferior and superior (hīna-paītā); and, evil and good (kaha-sukka).  An alternate explanation in the nikayas is that this factor is aroused by "discriminating that Dhamma with wisdom" (taṃ dhamma paññāya pavicināti).

Abhidhamma
The Abhidhamma's Dhammasai even more strongly associates dhamma vicaya with paññā (wisdom) in its enumeration of wholesome states (kusalā dhammā):
What on that occasion is the faculty of wisdom (paññindriya)?
The wisdom which there is on that occasion is understanding, search, research, searching the Truth....
where "searching the Truth" is C.A.F. Rhys Davids' translation of dhammavicayo.

In later Abhidhamma texts and in post-canonical literature (such as those by the 4th-century CE Indian scholar Vasubandhu), dhamma vicaya refers to the study of dhamma as physical or mental phenomena that constitute absolute reality (Pali: paramattha; Skt.: paramārtha).

See also
 Bodhipakkhiya dhamma
 Prajna
 Three marks of existence
 Vipassana

Notes

References

Sources

 

 

 
 . A general on-line search engine for the PED is available at http://dsal.uchicago.edu/dictionaries/pali/.

 Thanissaro Bhikkhu (trans.) (1995). Ananda Sutta: To Ananda (On Mindfulness of Breathing) (SN 54.13). Retrieved 2008-07-07 from "Access to Insight" at http://www.accesstoinsight.org/tipitaka/sn/sn54/sn54.013.than.html.
 
 Thanissaro Bhikkhu (trans.) (2006). Anapanasati Sutta: Mindfulness of Breathing (MN 118). Retrieved 2008-07-07 from "Access to Insight" at http://www.accesstoinsight.org/tipitaka/mn/mn.118.than.html.

 Williams, Paul (1989; repr. 2007). Mahayana Buddhism.  London: Routledge. .

Buddhist philosophical concepts